Taleb Qeshlaqi (also Romanized as Ţāleb Qeshlāqī) is a village in Arshaq-e Sharqi Rural District of the Central District of Ardabil County, Ardabil province, Iran. At the 2006 census, its population was 2,140 in 408 households. The following census in 2011 counted 1,822 people in 482 households. The latest census in 2016 showed a population of 1,409 people in 400 households; it is the largest village in its rural district.

Tageo

References 

Ardabil County

Towns and villages in Ardabil County

Populated places in Ardabil Province

Populated places in Ardabil County